The Cyworld Digital Music Awards was a South Korean music awards ceremony. It was established in 2006 to recognize songs with the largest monthly digital sales on the Cyworld social network service. Monthly awards were also given to popular songs by new artists, popular songs by international artists, and critically acclaimed songs (which received awards called "Tam Eum Mania"). Annual awards were given for the most popular songs of 2009 and 2010.

Annual award winners 
Girl group 2NE1 was the biggest winner at the 2009 Cyworld Digital Music Awards, earning four awards including Artist of the Year and Song of the Year. At the 2010 awards, 4Men won Artist of the Year, while 2PM won Song of the Year. The complete list of winners for both years is below.

Artist of the Year

Song of the Year

Rookie Award

Tam Eum Mania Award

Original Soundtrack Award

Composer Award

Best 10 Award

Other awards

Monthly award winners

2006

2007

2008

2009

2010

2011

2012

2013

See also
 Cyworld
 SK Telecom

References

External links

 

SK Group subsidiaries
South Korean music awards
Awards established in 2006
Annual events in South Korea